Calliostoma bullatum is a species of sea snail, a marine gastropod mollusk in the family Calliostomatidae.

Distribution 
Fossil evidence indicates that this species formerly lived as far north as what is now the Mediterranean Sea, but presently it is only known from abyssal habitats off the coast of West Africa, where it largely lives among deep-water coral reefs.

Description and rediscovery 
This species is notable for being described as a fossil well before live individuals were found. The species was originally described from fossil specimens from early-mid Pleistocene outcrops in southern Italy. After over a century, live individuals were found in deepwater reefs off the coast of Mauritania. This makes C. bullatum an example of a fossil Lazarus taxon.

References

External links
 Philippi R.A. (1844). Enumeratio molluscorum Siciliae cum viventium tum in tellure tertiaria fossilium, quae in itinere suo observavit. Vol. 2. Halle [Halis Saxorum]: Eduard Anton. iv + 303 pp., pls 13-28
  La Perna R. & d'Abramo M. (2010). Una collezione di G. Seguenza conservata presso I'lstituto Tecnico Commerciale "O.G. Costa" di Lecce. Bollettino Malacologico. 46: 29-35
 Hoffman, L.; Beuck, L.; Van Heugten, B.; Lavaleye, M.; Freiwald, A. (2019). Last snails standing since the Early Pleistocene, a tale of Calliostomatidae (Gastropoda) living in deep-water coral habitats in the north-eastern Atlantic. Zootaxa. 4613(1): 93-110

bullatum
Gastropods described in 1844